Joseph Vazhackan (Malayalam: ജോസഫ് വാഴക്കന്‍) is an Indian politician from Kerala. He belongs to the Indian National Congress party. He represented Muvattupuzha Constituency in the 13th Kerala Legislative Assembly. He is currently the Vice President and Spokesperson of Kerala Pradesh Congress Committee (KPCC). He is also a Member of All India Congress Committee (AICC).

Joseph Vazhackan came to the public platform by leading the student movements in his school days and became Kerala Students Union (KSU) State President. He has headed several INTUC affiliated unions.

Political life
Vice President, Kerala Pradesh Congress Committee (KPCC) (2011-2021)
Member of the Legislative Assembly (India), Muvattupuzha (2011-2016)
General Secretary, Kerala Pradesh Congress Committee (KPCC) (1999-2011)
Indian Rubber Board Member (2004-2012)
Kottayam District Panchayat Opposition leader (1995-2000)
Secretary, Kerala Pradesh Congress Committee (KPCC) (1994-1999)
Indian Youth Congress, Kerala State General Secretary (1984-1994)
State President of Kerala Students Union (KSU) (1982-1983)

Personal life
Joseph Vazhackan was born at Ramapuram (near Pala), Kottayam district on February 6, 1957.

References

Notes

 https://www.facebook.com/josephvazhackan

External links 
 

Living people
Members of the Kerala Legislative Assembly
Indian National Congress politicians from Kerala
People from Kottayam district
Year of birth missing (living people)